The Numugen (Numagen) languages are a small family of closely related languages in the Madang branch of the Trans–New Guinea languages (TNG) phylum of New Guinea, spoken in the region of the Numagen River.

The languages are:

Usan (Wanuma), Karian (Bilakura), Yaben, Yarawata, Parawen, Ukuriguma

Proto-language
For a list of Proto-Numugen reconstructions, see Pick (2020).

Footnotes

References
 

 
Languages of Papua New Guinea
Amaimon–Numagen languages